Marcelo Mendiharat Pommies (born 2 May, 1914 in Ostabat-Asme) was a French clergyman and auxiliary bishop for the Roman Catholic Diocese of Salto, and later for Roman Catholic Diocese of Zerta. He became ordained in 1945. He was appointed bishop in 1959. He died in 2007.

References

French Roman Catholic bishops in South America
1941 births
2007 deaths
French Roman Catholic bishops in Africa
Roman Catholic bishops of Salto